The Indus Golf Club is a golf course in Attock, Pakistan. It has 9 holes. It is the only golf course in Attock to entertain citizens of Attock. It is maintained by Pakistan Army's Artillery Centre Attock.

References 

Attock District
Golf clubs and courses in Pakistan
Sports venues in Pakistan